Cyphaspis is a genus of small trilobite that lived from the Late Ordovician to the Late Devonian. Fossils have been found in marine strata in what is now Europe, Africa and North America.  Various species had a compact body, and a large, bulbous glabellum.  Many species had long spines arranged similarly to closely related genera, such as Otarian, Otarionella, Chamaeleoaspis, and Namuropyge.

Species 
The following species in the genus Cyphaspis have been described:

C. anticostiensis 
C. bellula 
C. bluhmi Van Viersen & Holland, 2016
C. boninoi Van Viersen & Holland, 2016
C. bowingensis 
C. buchbergeri Adrain & Chatterton, 1996
C. burmeisteri 
C. ceratophthalma Goldfuss, 1843 (type)
C. ceratophthalmoides 
C. clintoni 
C. coelebs 
C. convexa 
C. craspedota 
C. dereimsi 
C. diadema 
C. eximia Van Viersen & Holland, 2016
C. foumzguidensis Van Viersen & Holland, 2016
C. gaultieri 
C. globosus 
C. heisingi Van Viersen & Holland, 2016
C. hoepfneri 
C. hudsonica 
C. hybrida 
C. hydrocephala 
C. ihmadii Van Viersen & Holland, 2016
C. insolata Van Viersen, Taghon & Magrean, 2019
C. iuxta Van Viersen, Taghon & Magrean, 2019
C. juergenhollandi Van Viersen & Holland, 2016
C. khraidensis Van Viersen & Holland, 2016
C. kippingi Van Viersen & Holland, 2016
C. koimeterionensis Van Viersen & Vanherle, 2018
C. kweberi Van Viersen & Holland, 2016
C. lerougei Van Viersen & Holland, 2016
C. lowei Adrain & Chatterton, 1996
C. mactavishi Adrain & Chatterton, 1996
C. maharchensis Van Viersen & Holland, 2016
C. matulina 
C. megalops 
C. minuscula 
C. munii Adrain & Chatterton, 1996
C. partim
C. parvula 
C. planifrons 
C. punctillosa 
C. raripustulosus
C. sibirica Schmidt, 1886
C. smeenki Van Viersen & Holland, 2016
C. spinulocervix
C. spryi
C. stephanophora
C. stigmatopthalmus
C. tadachachtensis Van Viersen & Holland, 2016
C. trentonensis
C. trigoda
C. walteri
C. yassensis

Distribution 
Fossils of Cyphaspis have been found in:

Devonian
Colombia (Floresta Formation, Altiplano Cundiboyacense), the Czech Republic, Morocco, United States (Alaska, Iowa, Oklahoma), and Uzbekistan

Silurian
Canada (Northwest Territories, Nunavut, Ontario), the United Kingdom, and the United States (Indiana, New York, Tennessee)

Ordovician
Sweden, and the United States (Illinois, Kentucky, Missouri)

References

Further reading 
 Richard Fortey, Trilobite: Eyewitness to Evolution

External links 

 Cyphasis on Trilobites.info

Proetida genera
Ordovician trilobites
Silurian trilobites
Devonian trilobites
Trilobites of Africa
Trilobites of Asia
Trilobites of Europe
Paleozoic Europe
Trilobites of North America
Silurian Canada
Paleozoic United States
Devonian trilobites of South America
Devonian Colombia
Fossils of Colombia
Late Ordovician first appearances
Late Devonian animals
Late Devonian genus extinctions
Fossil taxa described in 1843
Paleozoic life of Ontario
Floresta Formation
Paleozoic life of the Northwest Territories
Paleozoic life of Nunavut